Luc Pillot (born 10 July 1959) is a French sailor and Olympic champion.

He won a gold medal in the 470 Class at the 1988 Summer Olympics in Seoul, together with Thierry Peponnet. They received bronze medals in 1984.

Pillot won the yachting race Tour de France à la voile in 1998. He was the skipper of Le Défi at the 2003 Louis Vuitton Cup.

References

External links
 
 
 

1959 births
Living people
French male sailors (sport)
Olympic sailors of France
Sailors at the 1984 Summer Olympics – 470
Sailors at the 1988 Summer Olympics – 470
Olympic gold medalists for France
Olympic medalists in sailing
Medalists at the 1988 Summer Olympics
Medalists at the 1984 Summer Olympics
Olympic bronze medalists for France
2003 America's Cup sailors
470 class world champions
World champions in sailing for France